Baccharis thesioides  is a North American species of shrubs in the family Asteraceae known by the common name Arizona baccharis. It is widespread in Mexico from Chihuahua to Oaxaca, and also found in the southwestern United States (Arizona + New Mexico).

Baccharis thesioides  is a branching shrub up to 200 cm (80 inches) tall. It grows in mountains and canyons in pine-oak forests.

References

External links

thesioides
Flora of Arizona
Flora of New Mexico
Flora of Northeastern Mexico
Flora of Central Mexico
Flora of Southwestern Mexico
Flora of Chihuahua (state)
Flora of Michoacán
Flora of the Sonoran Deserts
Flora of the Mexican Plateau
Plants described in 1818
Taxa named by Carl Sigismund Kunth